The 2012 season for  began in January at the Tour Down Under. As a UCI ProTeam, they were automatically invited and obligated to send a squad to every event in the UCI World Tour.

The team experiences a managerial change, as Igor González de Galdeano left the post at the end of 2011 season, and was replaced by the man named, Miguel Madariaga. Madariaga has stated that he was taking the position only for 2012 and will leave before 2013, perhaps not coincidentally when the Basque government will remove or at least greatly reduce their financial commitment to the team.

2012 roster
Ages as of 1 January 2012.

Riders who joined the team for the 2012 season

Riders who left the team during or after the 2011 season

Rider who left the team during the 2012 season

Season victories

Death of Victor Cabedo
On September 19, 2012, squad member Victor Cabedo died in a training accident near his home of Onda, following a collision with a vehicle, subsequently falling into a ravine. He was 23.

References

2012 road cycling season by team
2012 in Spanish road cycling
Euskaltel–Euskadi